Sunwest Aviation is an aircraft charter operator and fixed-base operator (FBO) based at the Calgary International Airport in Calgary, Alberta, Canada.

History
It was established in 1986 as Sunwest Home Aviation and rebranded with the current name in 2006.

On 1 October 2014, Sunwest took over the operations of Alta Flights. Along with Cenovus Energy they operate the Axe Lake Aerodrome.

On 15 December 2018, Sunwest Aviation entered the fixed-base operator (FBO) business and became the official Shell AeroCentre in Calgary. In addition to being the newest FBO in Calgary, Sunwest continues to provide aircraft charter, and aircraft management for aircraft owners.

The company provides air ambulance, Sunwest AeroMedical, and medical repatriation services in addition to participating in HOPE (Human Organ Procurement and Exchange Program) by providing aero-medical services that allow for the time sensitive transportation of lifesaving organs.

Fleet
The airline has a fleet of 30 aircraft, including 15 jets.

Current fleet

As of January 2023, Transport Canada lists the following aircraft as being in the Sunwest Fleet:

Historical fleet
Over the years Sunwest has flown over 300 aircraft. In addition to other aircraft of the types listed above Sunwest has previously flown the following:
Beechcraft King Air
Beechcraft Model 18 (Beech 3NM)
Boeing B75N1
British Aerospace 125
Cessna 208 Caravan
Cessna 425
Cessna 441 Conquest II
Cessna Citation II (Cessna 550)
Cessna Citation V (Cessna 560)
Gulfstream G550 (Gulfstream GV-SP)
Hawker 800 (Raytheon Hawker 800XP)
Learjet 35
Learjet 55

References

External links

Sunwest Aviation official website

Regional airlines of Alberta
Charter airlines of Canada
Calgary International Airport